Claude François Bruno Siblot (6 October 1752 – 20 October 1801) was a French physician.

1752 births
1801 deaths
Members of the Legislative Assembly (France)
18th-century French physicians
Regicides of Louis XVI
Représentants en mission
Place of birth missing